José Carlos Ruiz (born 17 November 1936) is a Mexican film and television actor. He starred in telenovelas such as María Isabel, Soñadoras, Mariana de la noche, Sortilegio,  Soy Tu Dueña, Un Refugio para el Amor, Amor Bravío and Corazon Indomable.

Biography
José Ruiz comes from humble origins and was once a hired hand for the company Luz y Fuerza. He worked as an assistant coffee mill worker, a butcher, and also an interior decorator, until he began his acting studies at Mexico's Institute of Fine Arts.

Selected filmography
 Warehoused (2015)
 One for the Road (2014)
 Suave patria (2011): Jerónimo Natage
 Más allá del muro (2011):
 El estudiante (2009): Don Pedro.
 Cabeza de Buda (2009): Invitado 2
 Arráncame la vida (2008): Soriano
 Guadalupe (film) (2006): San Juan Diego
 Curandero (film) (2005): Don Carlos
 Los muertos que nos dieron la vida (2003)
 mariana de la noche (2003)
 Viaje aterrador (2002):
 Aunque tú no lo sepas (2000): Alumno 1
 Soñadoras (1998): Don Eugenio de la Peña 
 Dos crímenes (1995): Ramón
 La tumba del Atlántico (1992):
 ¿Nos traicionará el presidente? (1991):
 Salvador (1986): Archbishop Óscar Romero
 Toña machetes (1985):
 Wandering Lives (1985): Francisco
 Bajo la metralla (1983)
 Guerilla from the North (1983)
 Who'll Stop the Rain (1978)
 El elegido (1977): Judas
 The Heist (1976)
 The Bricklayers (1976): Jacinto Martínez
 The House in the South (1975): Tomás
 El valle de los miserables (1975):
 Simón Blanco (1975): Lic. Caldoso
 Los perros de Dios (1974):
 La muerte de Pancho Villa (1974):
 Buck and the Preacher (1972): Brave
 Los marcados (1971): el Manco
 Zapata (1970):
 El escapulario (1968): Ruiz, soldier
 Black Wind (1965):
 Major Dundee (1965): Riago, a "Christian Indian" scout of the Americans pursuing the Apaches.

Telenovelas

María Isabel (1966) - Pedro
Las víctimas (1967)
La tormenta (1967) - Benito Juárez
Mi amor por ti (1969)-Roque
La constitución (1970) - Jovito
La Gata (1970) - Don Lupe
El carruaje (1972) - Benito Juárez
Mundo de juguete (1974/1977) - Mateo
Ven conmigo (TV series) (1975)
Los bandidos del río frío (1976) - Bedolla
Una limosna de amor (1981)-Jeremias
La traición (1984/1985) - Cholo
Muchachita (1985/1986) - Pascual Sanchez
Las grandes aguas (1989) - Graciano Alonso
Más allá del puente (1993/1994) - Angel
Agujetas de color de rosa (1994/1995-Odilon)
Morir dos veces (1996) - Orduna
Pueblo chico, infierno grande (1997) - Arcadio Zamora 
María Isabel (1997/1998) - Pedro
Soñadoras (1998/1999) - Eugenio De La Pena
La casa en la playa (2000) - Severo Rincon
Atrévete a olvidarme (2001) - Cecilio Ramadàn
Las Vias del Amor (2002/2003) - Fidel Gutièrrez Arismendi
Mariana de la noche (2003/2004) - Isidoro Valtierra
Peregrina (TV series) (2005/2006) - Castillo
Amar sin límites (2006/2007) - Aurelio Huerta
Tormenta en el paraíso (2007/2008) - Sacerdote Ahzac
Cuidado con el ángel (2008/2009) - Andres
Sortilegio (2009) - Jesús "Chucho" Gavira
Soy Tu Dueña (2010) - Sabino Mercado
Un Refugio para el Amor (2012) - Galindo Jacinto
Amor Bravío (2012) - Padre Baldomero Lozano
Corazon Indomable (2013) - Padre Julian
La candidata (2016/2017) - Miembro Del Senado
Mi adorable maldición (2017) - Ponciano Suarez
Como dice el dicho (2017) - David
Por amar sin ley (2018) - Armando

References

External links 
 

1936 births
Ariel Award winners
Best Actor Ariel Award winners
Living people
Mexican male film actors
Mexican male telenovela actors
People from Zacatecas